The chief justice of Singapore is the presiding member of the Supreme Court of Singapore. It is the highest office in the judicial system of Singapore, appointed by the president, on the advice of the prime minister. The incumbent chief justice is Sundaresh Menon, who took office on 6 November 2012. He was the first chief justice to be born in Singapore.

History
Prior to 1959, the chief justice was appointed by the governor of Singapore, when Singapore was still a Crown colony part of the British Empire.

List of chief justices (1965–present)

Chief Justices of the Republic of Singapore

List of chief justices (1867–1965)

Chief Justices of the Straits Settlements

Chief Justices of the Colony of Singapore

Chief Justices of the State of Singapore

See also
 President of Singapore
 Prime Minister of Singapore
 Attorney-General of Singapore

External links
 List of former judges

Singapore